The 1992 NCAA Division I baseball tournament was played at the end of the 1992 NCAA Division I baseball season to determine the national champion of college baseball.  The tournament concluded with eight teams competing in the College World Series, a double-elimination tournament in its forty sixth year.  Eight regional competitions were held to determine the participants in the final event.  Each region was composed of six teams, resulting in 48 teams participating in the tournament at the conclusion of their regular season, and in some cases, after a conference tournament.  The forty-sixth tournament's champion was Pepperdine, coached by Andy Lopez.  The Most Outstanding Player was Phil Nevin of Cal State Fullerton. As of 2021, this is the last tournament in which no SEC teams  have managed to advance to the College World Series.

Regionals
The opening rounds of the tournament were played across eight regional sites across the country, each consisting of a six-team field. Each regional tournament is double-elimination, however region brackets are variable depending on the number of teams remaining after each round. The winners of each regional advanced to the College World Series.

Bold indicates winner.

Atlantic Regional
at Coral Gables, FL

Central Regional
at Austin, TX

East Regional
at Gainesville, FL

Mideast Regional
at Starkville, MS

Midwest Regional
at Wichita, KS

South Regional
at Baton Rouge, LA

South II Regional
at Tallahassee, FL

West Regional
at Tucson, AZ

College World Series
Through the 2021 event, this was the last time a Southeastern Conference team did not reach the College World Series.

Participants

Results

Bracket
The teams in the CWS are divided into two pools of four, with each pool playing a double-elimination format. The winners of the two pools meet in the National Championship game.

Game results

All-Tournament Team
The following players were members of the College World Series All-Tournament Team.

Notable players
 Cal State Fullerton: Bret Hemphill, Dan Naulty, Phil Nevin, Dante Powell, Steve Sisco
 California: Geoff Blum, Mike Cather, Chris Clapinski, Eric Ludwick, Matt Luke, Jon Zuber
 Florida State: Roger Bailey, Chris Brock, Tim Davis, John Wasdin, Paul Wilson
 Miami (FL): Dave Berg, Gus Gandarillas, Danny Graves, Charles Johnson
 Oklahoma: Greg Norton
 Pepperdine: Pat Ahearne, Steve Montgomery, Steve Rodriguez, Derek Wallace, Mark Wasikowski
 Texas: Brooks Kieschnick, Stephen Larkin, Calvin Murray
 Wichita State: Jaime Bluma, Darren Dreifort, Doug Mirabelli, Kennie Steenstra

See also
 1992 NCAA Division I softball tournament
 1992 NCAA Division II baseball tournament
 1992 NCAA Division III baseball tournament
 1992 NAIA World Series

References

NCAA Division I Baseball Championship
 
Baseball in Austin, Texas